Manan Hingrajia (born 17 February 1998) is an Indian cricketer. He won M.A. Chidambaram trophy – Highest run getter in (U23) Col. CK Nayadu Trophy in 2018-19.He made his List A debut on 24 September 2019, for Gujarat in the 2019–20 Vijay Hazare Trophy. He made his first-class debut on 3 March 2022, for Gujarat in the 2021–22 Ranji Trophy.He led Gujarat team in winning the Men's U25 State A Trophy 2021-22.

References

External links
 

1998 births
Living people
Indian cricketers
Gujarat cricketers
Place of birth missing (living people)